Cutris is a district of the San Carlos canton, in the Alajuela province of Costa Rica.

History 
Cutris was created on 26 November 1971 by Decreto Ejecutivo 2083-G.

Geography 
Cutris has an area of  km² which makes it the largest district in the canton by area and an elevation of  metres.

It is located in the northern region of the country and borders with 6 districts; Pocosol al oeste, Aguas Zarcas y Pital al Este, Palmera, Florencia y La Fortuna.  While to the north it borders Nicaragua.

Its head, the town of Boca Arenal, is located 33.4 km (47 minutes) to the N of Ciudad Quesada and 133 km (2 hours 34 minutes) to the NW of San Jose the capital of the nation.

It presents a flat relief in the majority of its territory.

Demographics 

For the 2011 census, Cutris had a population of  inhabitants, the seventh most populated of the canton.

Transportation

Road transportation 
The district is covered by the following road routes:
 National Route 4
 National Route 35
 National Route 227
 National Route 751
 National Route 753

Settlements
Cutris has 24 population centers:

Boca de Arenal (head of the district)
Kooper
Corazón de Jesús
Terrón Colorado
San Josecito
Santa Teresa
San Jorge
Bella Vista
San Pedro
San Marcos
San Joaquín
Coopevega
Las Cascadas
Rico Tino
Moravia
Crucitas
Chamorro
Tiricias
Boca Tapada
Laurel Galán
El Jardín
Cocobolo
San Francisco
Betania

Economy 

At present, this district makes livestock and citrus cultivation (orange, pineapple and sugarcane), its main activities.

These provide employment to a large number of people, most of whom are Nicaraguan migrants who arrive in these lands attracted by the harvest.

In Boca de Arenal, (head of the district) you can find restaurants, grocery stores, butchers and a mill.

References 

Districts of Alajuela Province
Populated places in Alajuela Province